Calodesma dilutana is a moth of the family Erebidae. It was described by Herbert Druce in 1907. It is found in Brazil.

References

Calodesma
Moths described in 1907